"Bringing Back Your Love" is a single by Canadian country music group One Horse Blue. Released in 1995, it was the eighth single from their 1993 album One Horse Blue. The song reached #1 on the RPM Country Tracks chart in July 1995.

Chart performance

Year-end charts

References

1993 songs
1995 singles
One Horse Blue songs